Franklin Historic Properties is a historical site operated by the Idaho State Historical Society in Franklin, Idaho.  The site consists of the L. H. Hatch House, the Relic Hall, and Franklin Cooperative Mercantile Institution, which were separately listed on the National Register of Historic Places in 1973, 2001, and 1991 respectively.

Hatch House

The L. H. Hatch House is a two-story stone Greek Revival house. Its design features the typical street-facing gable end and three-bay front facade; details include stone quoins at the corners and decorative woodwork. The house was constructed in 1874, after the Greek Revival's height of popularity in America, and is one of the best-preserved examples of the style in Idaho.

Relic Hall

The Relic Hall is a rustic-style building constructed in 1937. The Civilian Conservation Corps built the structure, and its design exhibits the typical log architecture used by the CCC; this design consists of a stone foundation, log walls, and a shingle roof with exposed rafters. The building houses a variety of historical collections; while the Idaho State Historical Society owns the building, the collections are administered by the Idaho Pioneer Association.

Franklin Cooperative Mercantile Institution

The Franklin Cooperative Mercantile Institution, which was built in 1869, was a cooperative general store organized as part of a wider Mormon movement. The movement, which was centrally led by Mormon authorities, saw the opening of local general stores which received their goods both from wholesalers and community residents. The store building is a stone Greek Revival structure; while stone was a common building material during the Mormon settlement of Idaho, few of Franklin's early stone buildings survive. The cooperative store operated until the 1880s, when the cooperative movement faded and it was bought by a single owner. In 1923, the building became one of Idaho's first history museums and was the predecessor of the Relic Hall.

References

External links
Idaho State Historical Site: Franklin Historic Properties

Houses on the National Register of Historic Places in Idaho
Commercial buildings on the National Register of Historic Places in Idaho
Houses completed in 1869
Houses completed in 1874
Houses completed in 1937
Houses in Franklin County, Idaho
History museums in Idaho
Religious museums in the United States
Museums in Franklin County, Idaho
Idaho State Historical Society
National Register of Historic Places in Franklin County, Idaho